The 58th United States Colored Infantry was an infantry regiment that served in the Union Army during the American Civil War. The regiment was composed of African American enlisted men commanded by white officers and was authorized by the Bureau of Colored Troops which was created by the United States War Department on May 22, 1863.

Service
The 58th U.S. Colored Infantry was organized from the 6th Mississippi Infantry (African Descent) on March 11, 1864 for three-year service under the command of Colonel Simon Manly Preston.

The regiment was attached to Post of Natchez, Mississippi, District of Vicksburg, Mississippi, to April 1866.

The 58th U.S. Colored Infantry mustered out of service March 8, 1866.

Detailed service
Post and garrison duty at Natchez and in the Department of Mississippi during its entire term of service. Expedition from Natchez to Gillespie's Plantation, Louisiana, August 4-6, 1864.

Commanders
 Colonel Simon Manly Preston

See also

List of United States Colored Troops Civil War Units
United States Colored Troops
List of Mississippi Union Civil War units

References
 Dyer, Frederick H. A Compendium of the War of the Rebellion (Des Moines, IA: Dyer Pub. Co.), 1908.
Attribution

United States Colored Troops Civil War units and formations
Military units and formations established in 1864
Military units and formations disestablished in 1866